The politics of Tonga take place in a framework of a constitutional monarchy, whereby the King is the Head of State and the Commander-in-Chief of the Armed Forces. Tonga's Prime Minister is currently appointed by the King from among the members of Parliament after having won the support of a majority of its members.  Executive power is vested in the Cabinet of Ministers. Legislative power is vested in the King in Parliament, and judicial power is vested in the supreme court.

Tonga joined the Commonwealth of Nations in 1970, and the United Nations in 1999. While exposed to colonial forces, Tonga has never lost indigenous governance, a fact that makes Tonga unique in the Pacific and boosts confidence in the monarchical system. The British High Commission in Tonga closed in March 2006.

Tonga's current king, Tupou VI, traces his line directly back through six generations of monarchs. The previous king, George Tupou V, born in 1946, continued to have ultimate control of the government until July 2008. At that point, concerns over financial irregularities and calls for democracy led to his relinquishing most of his day-to-day powers over the government.

Executive

|King
|Tupou VI
|
|18 March 2012
|-
|Prime Minister
|Siaosi Sovaleni
|Independent
|27 December 2021
|}
Its executive includes the prime minister and the cabinet, which becomes the Privy Council when presided over by the monarch. In intervals between legislative sessions, the Privy Council makes ordinances, which become law if confirmed by the legislature. The monarch is hereditary and appoints all members of the cabinet, including the prime minister and the deputy prime minister.

Legislature

The Legislative Assembly is composed of representatives of the Nobles and representatives of the people. This composition is established by Article 59 of the Constitution as amended by the " Constitution of Tonga amendment Act 2010 " Article 51 of the same Act allows the PM to nominate and the King to appoint up to 4 extra cabinet members from outside the Assembly.

The current composition is:
 9 Nobles
 17 Elected by Commoners

Political parties and elections

The electoral system was changed in April 2010, with 17 of 26 representatives now directly elected.

By-elections
Below is a list of recent or upcoming by-elections:

Courts

Tonga's court system consists of the Court of Appeal (Privy Council), the Supreme Court, the Magistrates' Court, and the Land Court. Judges are appointed by the monarch.

The judiciary is headed by a Chief Justice. The current Chief Justice is Michael Hargreaves Whitten.

Administrative divisions
Tonga is divided in three island groups; Ha'apai, Tongatapu, Vava'u. The only form of local government is through town and district officials who have been popularly elected since 1965. The town official represents the central government in the villages, the district official has authority over a group of villages.

See also
 Electoral calendar
 Electoral system
 Lists of political parties
 2006 Tonga riots

References

External links
Adam Carr's Election Archive

 
Political parties in Tonga